Thelenellaceae is a family of lichen-forming fungi. It is the sole family in the monotypic order Thelenellales, and contains three genera and about 50 species.

Taxonomy
The family was initially proposed by Ove Erik Eriksson, and later formally published by Helmut Mayrhofer in 1987. The order Thelenellales, containing only family Thelenellaceae, was proposed by H. Thorsten Lumbsch and Steven Leavitt in 2018. However, the taxon was not validly published because "an identifier issued by a recognized repository was not cited in the protologue", contrary to rules of botanical nomenclature. This nomenclatural oversight was rectified later the same year in a separate publication.

Description
Lichens in the family are typically crustose or areolate, and grow on bark or on rocks. They have ascomata in the form of thick-walled, pale to dark brown perithecia. Collectively, the species in the family have a widespread distribution.

Genera
This is a list of the genera in the Thelenellaceae, based on a 2021 review and summary of fungal classification by Wijayawardene and colleagues. Following the genus name is the taxonomic authority (those who first circumscribed the genus; standardized author abbreviations are used), year of publication, and the number of species:
Aspidothelium  – 17 spp.
Chromatochlamys  – 3 spp.
Thelenella  – 30 spp.

References

Lecanoromycetes
Lecanoromycetes families
Lichen families
Taxa described in 2018
Taxa named by Helge Thorsten Lumbsch